Richard "Dickie" Wells (1908–1949) was an American tap dancer and playboy.  Wells was affectionately known as Mr. Harlem.  Initially he worked as part of the “Wells, Mordecai and Taylor” Dance Trio (Jimmy Mordecai, and Ernest Taylor) performed at locations such as The Cotton Club.  Wells parlayed his membership from the Dance Trio into being a nightclub owner.

Playboy
Wells was very popular with women and was thought to have had relations with many famous women including Nina Mae McKinney, Joan Crawford, Tallulah Bankhead, Ava Gardner, and Lana Turner, Margherite Chapman (who later married Willie Mays), and Jean Parks.  He is said to have been the inventor of Chicken and Waffles.  This led to the same pairing of the food in 1976, by a Harlem native named Herb Hudson, who made Roscoe's House of Chicken and Waffles  Wells introduced Joe Louis to a number of women.

Club
Wells owned and ran the "Dickie's Club".  It was known for its food and it was here that he is said to have been the inventor of Chicken and Waffles.  His club was attended by numerous individuals including Tallulah Bankhead, Errol Flynn, Ava Gardner, Clark Gable, Bumpy Johnson and Charlie Chaplin, Joan Crawford, and Harlemite Walter Winchell. A noted performer at his restaurant was Billy Daniels

Trial
Wells was brought into a trial concerning Tallulah Bankhead. Wells was also brought into a trial involving Jean Parks involving a US Diplomats Daughter who became a call girl.  It was also believed that Wells sold cocaine to Tallulah Bankhead.

Death
Wells died of alcohol and cocaine at age 41.  He passed away at the apartment of Jean Parks.  Wells is buried at Woodlawn Cemetery in the Bronx, NY.

References

1908 births
1949 deaths
American tap dancers
American male dancers
African-American male dancers